Tell It Like It Is may refer to:

Tell It Like It Tis, a 1966 album by Richard "Groove" Holmes
Tell It Like It Is (George Benson album), 1969
Tell It Like It Is (Billy Joe Royal album), 1989
Tell It Like It Is, a 2010 album by Thomas Quasthoff
"Tell It Like It Is" (song), a 1966 song written by George Davis and Lee Diamond
"Tell It Like It T-I-Is", a song by the B-52's, 1992
Tell It Like It Is (talk show), a Chinese talk show aired from 1996 to 2009